Overpeck may refer to:

People:
Lem Overpeck (1911–2003), the 29th Lieutenant Governor of South Dakota from 1965 to 1969

Settlements:
Overpeck Township, New Jersey, former township in Bergen County, New Jersey, United States, from 1897 to 1938
Overpeck, Ohio, unincorporated community in central St. Clair Township, Butler County, Ohio, United States

Geography:
Overpeck Creek, tributary of the Hackensack River in Bergen County in northeastern New Jersey in the United States
Overpeck County Park, 811 acre (3.28 km2) county park in Bergen County, New Jersey, United States

de:Overpeck
vo:Overpeck